The 2004 Toray Pan Pacific Open was a women's tennis tournament played on indoor carpet courts. It was the 21st edition of the Toray Pan Pacific Open, and was part of the Tier I Series of the 2004 WTA Tour. It took place at the Tokyo Metropolitan Gymnasium in Tokyo, Japan, from January 30 through February 8, 2004. Lindsay Davenport won the singles title.

Finals

Singles

 Lindsay Davenport defeated  Magdalena Maleeva, 6–4, 6–1
 It was Davenport's 1st singles title of the year and the 39th of her career.

Doubles

 Cara Black /  Rennae Stubbs  defeated  Elena Likhovtseva /   Magdalena Maleeva, 6–0, 6–1

External links

Singles, Doubles and Qualifying Singles draws

Toray Pan Pacific Open
Pan Pacific Open
Toray Pan Pacific Open
Toray Pan Pacific Open
Toray Pan Pacific Open
Toray Pan Pacific Open